Vernonia glauca is a species of flowering plant in the family Asteraceae. It is endemic to the United States.

References

glauca
Endemic flora of the United States
Flora without expected TNC conservation status